Archana Chitnis (born 20 April 1964) is a Bharatiya Janata Party politician from Madhya Pradesh. She was a member of Madhya Pradesh Legislative Assembly representing Burhanpur (Vidhan Sabha constituency) and has served as education minister of the state. She returned to Shivraj Singh Chouhan's Cabinet as Minister of Women and Child Development.
She lost the 2018 Madhya Pradesh Legislative Assembly election against Thakur Surendra Singh from Burhanpur.

Early life
Entry into students politics in 1984, University Representative of Devi Ahilya University, Indore and Secretary of Government Degree College Student Union in 1984–85. Former lecturer of Gujarati Science College, Indore.

Political career
Member of Swayamsiddh cooperative sugar and agricultural industry limited, Vishrampur (Gudi) in Khandwa district and Swayamsiddh women cooperative Bank Limited, Indore and Ojaswini (women's magazine). City Secretary of BJP Mahila Morcha, Indore. State Coordinator of BJP cultural cell. Former executive member of National BJYM. Former state vice president of Mahila Morcha. Former Chief of Girls Wing of ABVP. In 2003, she was elected to 12th Vidhan Sabha and remained Minister for Women and Child Development, Social Welfare, Higher Education, Technical Education and Training, Animal Husbandry, Cow Promotion Board and social justice. State BJP's spokesperson. Traveled to many countries including Singapore, France, Germany. Elected as Member of 13th Vidhan Sabha in 2008 and appointed Minister of Technical Education and Training, School Education and Higher Education.

Elected for third time as MLA in year 2013. Smt. Archana Chitnis was inducted as Cabinet Minister on June 30, 2016 in the cabinet of Chief Minister Shri Shivraj Singh Chouhan.

References

Bharatiya Janata Party politicians from Madhya Pradesh
State cabinet ministers of Madhya Pradesh
Living people
1964 births
Madhya Pradesh MLAs 2008–2013
Madhya Pradesh MLAs 2013–2018
21st-century Indian women politicians
21st-century Indian politicians
Women state cabinet ministers of India
Women members of the Madhya Pradesh Legislative Assembly